Yorktown High School may refer to:

Yorktown High School (Yorktown, Indiana)
Yorktown High School (New York), Yorktown Heights, New York
Yorktown High School (Texas), Yorktown, Texas
Yorktown High School (Arlington County, Virginia)
York High School (Yorktown, Virginia)